All American Girl may refer to:

 All-American Girl (TV series), an American sitcom
 All American Girl (novel), a young-adult novel by Meg Cabot
 "All-American Girl" (song), a song by Carrie Underwood
 "All American Girl", a song by Melissa Etheridge from Yes I Am
 "All American Girl", a song by Train from My Private Nation
 All-American Girl: The Mary Kay Letourneau Story, a 2000 TV film

See also 
 American Girl (disambiguation)